Philip Crosby may refer to:
Phil Crosby (footballer) (born 1962), English footballer
Philip B. Crosby (1926–2001), businessman and author
Phil Crosby (American football) (born 1976), American football player 
Phillip Crosby (1934–2004), singer, son of Bing Crosby